Brett Gilliland (born June 2, 1981) is an American football coach.  He is the head football coach at the University of West Alabama. Previously Gilliland played quarterback for the West Alabama Tigers from 2000 to 2003 where he set several school records. He began his coaching career in 2004 and held assistant coaching positions at West Alabama, Georgia Tech, Georgia Southern and Kennesaw State. Gilliland was announced as West Alabama's 21st head coach on December 9, 2013.

Head coaching record

Filmography

References

External links
 
 West Alabama profile

1981 births
Living people
American football quarterbacks
Georgia Southern Eagles football coaches
Georgia Tech Yellow Jackets football coaches
Kennesaw State Owls football coaches
West Alabama Tigers football coaches
West Alabama Tigers football players
Sportspeople from Pensacola, Florida
Players of American football from Pensacola, Florida